Jeffrey Marc "Jeff" Herman (born 1959) is an American trial lawyer who specializes in representing victims of sexual abuse, and has been described as a "[t]op church sex abuse attorney". He is the founding and managing partner of the South Florida-based firm Herman Law, and has been described in the media as "the nation's leading attorney when it comes to handling high-profile sexual abuse lawsuits".

Herman gained substantial publicity for bringing cases against alleged sexual predators and institutions that protect them. He has been featured in The New York Times, USA Today, Forbes, People, and New York magazine and is a contributor to The O'Reilly Factor, MSNBC, and CNN. He is best known for exposing the clergy sexual abuse scandal in the Archdiocese of Miami and the Archdiocese of Denver, Herman is also noted for his landmark $100 million verdict on behalf of a client who was sexually abused by Rev. Neil Doherty, one of the largest verdicts ever against an individual priest. He has also represented clients against public figures, including financier Jeffrey Epstein, puppeteer Kevin Clash, and director Bryan Singer. By 2015, Herman stated that he had litigated more than 800 cases in the field.

Early life, education, and career
Born and raised in Youngstown, Ohio, Herman attended the University of Arizona, and received a J.D. from Case Western Reserve University School of Law in 1985, where he was on the editorial board of the Canada-United States Law Journal. He began practicing law in Florida in 1985, and "was a successful commercial lawyer before he shifted exclusively to sexual-abuse". In one case during this period, in 1995, Herman successfully represented Robin Elkins, a saxophonist who had patented a means of storing and retrieving bits of sound on a computer, a technology that led to electronic voice mail.

Sexual abuse cases

Cases in religious and educational settings
Herman's specialization in sexual abuse cases began with a 1997 case against Nova Southeastern University, which has failed to conduct a background check on a convicted child sex offender who had volunteered for a program run by the school, and who had molested an autistic child there. Herman credited the shift to a search for meaning that has been fulfilled by seeking justice for victims of abuse.

Herman first gained national attention in this field representing victims of clergy sexual abuse in over 100 cases against the Archdiocese of Miami. In 2003, he represented the victim in the first sexual abuse lawsuit against the Archdiocese of Miami allowed to go to trial. For years, the Catholic Church was able to have sexual abuse cases dismissed on statute of limitations technicalities. Herman became one of the first attorneys to successfully defeat this strategy- arguing that the archdiocese committed fraud by keeping a priest's sexual abuse history secret. In 2004, Herman represented the victims of Rev. Alvaro Guichard, a Catholic priest accused of sexually abusing four children in the 1970s. Guichard unexpectedly crashed a news conference held by Herman and the family of one of Guichard's deceased victims following the filing of the lawsuit. The priest confronted the family, calling them liars and while grabbing the brother of the victim's arm. Herman was able to pull Guichard off of the brother just before police arrived on the scene. Following the incident, Guichard filed a suit against Herman, claiming he defamed him when he accused him of rape and sodomy. In 2012, the defamation suit was dismissed by the Miami-Dade Circuit Court.

In the early 2000s, Herman tried his first cases regarding abuse of Native Americans under the authority of a Catholic diocese. It was reported at the time that "Herman is known nationally as a plaintiff's lawyer in clergy sexual abuse cases, but his reputation in Indian law circles is less established". In 2006, Herman represented an alleged victim of Anthony Mercieca, the priest accused of molesting U.S. congressman Mark Foley. The lawsuit alleged that Mercieca fondled and performed oral sex on the victim, who was a 13-year-old altar boy at St. James Church in North Miami. The suit sought $10 million in damages and settled in 2007 for an undisclosed amount. That same year, Herman represented the victims of Rabbi Joel Kolko, who was accused of molesting multiple young students of his yeshiva. The case was the first lawsuit against a Jewish leader to be filed following the Catholic Church sex abuse scandal. In 2007, Herman represented the alleged victim of Don Walk, the former Miami Dolphins team chaplain. Walk allegedly took the boy to Dolphins games, introduced him to players, and brought him to the house of coach Don Shula while grooming the boy for abuse.

In 2011, Herman won a $100 million verdict for a victim of Father Neil Doherty, a priest of the Archdiocese of Miami accused of drugging and raping church youths. The result was the nation's largest jury verdict for a sexual abuse case in 2011 and one of the year's top 20 verdicts overall. Herman – along with attorneys Adam Horowitz and Arick Fudali – won a $3 million jury verdict on behalf of a young girl who was sexually abused at Discovery Day Care in 2012. Testimony showed that the preschooler was abused on multiple occasions by the daycare director's 13-year-old son and that a center employee falsified documents related to the incident.

In 2014, Herman won a $5.25 million verdict for a boy in a sexual abuse lawsuit against Charter Schools USA. The verdict is believed to be among the highest ever in a charter school sexual abuse case.

In 2019, Herman represented New York clergy sex abuse victims in a lawsuit against the Vatican and Pope Francis, contending negligence in addressing misconduct within the priesthood.

Celebrity cases
Herman represented several teenage victims of financier Jeffrey Epstein in 2008. Epstein was convicted of felony solicitation of prostitution and procuring a person under the age of 18 for prostitution. Herman filed a civil suit alleging that the victims were as young as 14 years old when they were brought to Epstein's mansion to perform erotic massages. The suit sought $50 million in damages and eventually settled for an undisclosed amount.

Throughout 2012 and 2013, Herman represented five alleged victims of Elmo puppeteer, Kevin Clash. On November 20, 2012, Herman filed a lawsuit alleging that Clash sexually abused a 15-year-old boy he met on a gay phone chatline. Clash publicly resigned from Sesame Street later that day. While discussing the sexual abuse lawsuits he filed against Clash, Herman told The Baltimore Sun it has been his goal to "listen to sexual abuse victims and give them a voice".

Herman also filed lawsuits on behalf of two plaintiffs against X-Men director, Bryan Singer, the first in 2014, and the second in 2017. The plaintiff in the first case, Michael Egan, was a former child model and actor who accused Singer of repeatedly drugging, threatening and forcibly sodomizing him in the late 1990s, beginning when the boy was 15 years old. "Hollywood has a problem with the sexual exploitation of children. This is the first of many cases I will be filing to give these victims a voice and to expose the issue", Herman said in a statement shortly after filing. Herman filed another series of lawsuits against three more Hollywood executives: former Fox television executive Garth Ancier, theater producer Gary Wayne Goddard and former television executive David A. Neuman. However, within months all four lawsuits were dropped after Egan's stories continued to change and the cases began to fall apart.

Herman withdrew from representing Egan, and he and another former attorney of Egan's, Mark Gallagher, wrote letters of apology to Ancier and Neuman. Herman's letter stated that he had learned that he had "participated in making what I now know to be untrue and proveably false allegations"; accompanying the letters were an undisclosed seven-figure sum. The following year, Egan was sentenced to two years in prison after pleading guilty to unrelated fraud charges. The plaintiff in the second case, Cesar Sanchez-Guzman, filed a lawsuit in the state of Washington against Singer, alleging that he had been raped at age 17 by the director in 2003. Singer denied the allegations and removed himself from the public eye. In June 2019, Singer agreed to pay $150,000 to settle the case, which was approved by Sanchez-Guzman's bankruptcy trustee Nancy James, citing the absence of evidence that Singer attended the yacht party where the alleged assault took place. Singer's attorney Andrew Brettler said that Singer has maintained his innocence and that the "decision to resolve the matter with the bankruptcy trustee was purely a business one".

In 2015, Herman wrote an op-ed piece for Reuters about bringing down powerful men accused of rape. In the piece, he said the role of the internet in sexual abuse cases is changing and it can play a positive, equalizing role enabling victims to come forward and speak up in support of others.

Controversies 
In 2012, Herman's pursuit of a case against a rabbi stirred controversy, with participants in various internet forums asserting that Herman, as an observant Jew, was "bringing unwarranted shame on the Orthodox community". Advocates for various defendants sued by clients represented by Herman have complained that Herman has sought personal publicity through his cases. In 2012, the Archdiocese of Miami criticized press conferences held by Herman as not providing the full truth to the news media.

In 2015, Bryan Singer's attorney criticized Herman for holding a press conference regarding that case, accusing Herman of "seeking to get his 15 minutes of fame" and saying "Attorneys who try cases don't hold press conferences". Entertainment lawyer Jonathan Handel, who wrote a number of articles about Singer, wrote in a 2017 piece in The Hollywood Reporter that Herman was disciplined for two incidents of misconduct involving dishonesty, including a 1998 incident in which an Oregon District Court had reportedly barred Herman permanently from his courtroom following findings of alleged misrepresentations and dishonesty. Handel further wrote that, also in 1998, Herman had been accused of sexual battery by his then 19-year-old receptionist, who had accompanied Herman back to his apartment while Herman was separated from his wife. Handel reported that the police had referred that case to the District Attorney, and it was thereafter dropped for insufficient evidence. Handel also wrote that between 2014 and 2017, Herman was the debtor in four federal tax liens (from $210,000 to over $900,000), and that two major banks had also filed claims against the attorney for credit due, and foreclosure.

Recognition
In 2013, Jeff Herman was named "Child Advocate of the Year" by KidSafe Foundation during their 4th Annual Fundraiser. In reporting the award, the Observer noted that Herman has been "recognized for his unique child forensic interviewing technique, and he trains professionals from various child welfare organizations on how to help sexually abused children heal through disclosure". He has been referred to in the media as the "Dark Knight", fighting for the most vulnerable victims. Herman has also been referred to as the "legal eagle" and the "Go-To-Guy" for sexual abuse lawsuits.

While on MSNBC discussing the Jerry Sandusky sex abuse scandal, Herman coined the term "pedophile speak", describing the way pedophiles talk about and justify abusing children. While discussing the sexual abuse lawsuits he filed against Kevin Clash, Herman told The Baltimore Sun it has been his goal to "listen to sexual abuse victims and give them a voice". In an op-ed piece for Reuters about bringing down powerful men accused of rape, Herman said the role of the internet in sexual abuse cases is changing and it can play a positive, equalizing role enabling victims to come forward and speak up in support of others.

Personal life 
Herman is a practicing Jew and father of four. In 2008, the Miami Herald profiled Herman and reported on his greatest weakness: red meat. He has a favorite steakhouse in every city, never deviating from his order of a medium rare New York strip and a side salad. Herman is also an avid collector of wine and single malt scotch.

References

External links
Jeff Herman Profile
KidSafe Foundation

Herman on The Ed Show
Herman on Nancy Grace
Idea Mench interview with Jeff Herman (2018)

1959 births
American lawyers
Living people
People from Youngstown, Ohio
University of Arizona alumni
Case Western Reserve University School of Law alumni